Oakley School is a coeducational all-through school set to be opened in Leamington Spa in 2023. Construction on the school site is expected to be completed by 2024, however its first students will be temporarily housed in a facility at nearby Myton School.

History
Oakley School is being built to serve the need of over 1000 school placements generated by the neighbouring newly-built Oakley Grove housing estate. Its first students will be Year 7 pupils, who will be housed in a temporary facility at Myton School for the academic year beginning September 2023. After which the students will move to the Oakley School site alongside a further Year 7 cohort and its first reception year group.

The school appointed its first headteacher Sarah Kaye in October 2022.

Planning permission for the school site was given in 2019. Although originally expected to be open by 2023, work on the school site began on 12 December 2022, and is expected to be completed in 2024.

Controversy
The decision to delay the school's site opening by a year was met with anger from nearby residents, as many residents had moved to the nearby housing estate with the expectation of the school being ready for 2023. The school's solution to temporarily send pupils to a nearby school also drew criticism from residents, including a campaign group of over 200 parents and Labour Party Member of Parliament Matt Western, suggesting it could have a negative impact on their children's education and put pressure on nearby schools.

Oakley School's lack of a sixth form also faced criticism. Parents feared there would not be enough sixth form placements for the area, although WCC was confident a new sixth form was not "urgently needed".

References

External links

Academies in Warwickshire
Educational institutions established in 2023
Buildings and structures in Leamington Spa
Primary schools in Warwickshire
Secondary schools in Warwickshire
2023 establishments in England